"Overground" is a song by English rock band Siouxsie and the Banshees. It was originally featured on their debut studio album, The Scream (1978). The band re-recorded the track with elaborate, lush orchestral instrumentation with a flamenco acoustic guitar for its inclusion on the four-track extended play The Thorn (1984). This version was released as a single the same year by record label Polydor.

Music 
This version taken from The Thorn EP was co-produced with Mike Hedges. "Just how far they've come is shown by the '84 reworking of 'Overground'", observed Dave Morrison in a review of Twice Upon a Time – The Singles, "where the teeth-grating abrasion of old gives way to a panoramic sound of martial drumming, strings and flamenco guitars".

The Thorn version of "Overground" was later included on the 2004 box set Downside Up.

Release 
The Thorn version of "Overground" was released as a single on 19 October 1984 by Polydor, with "Placebo Effect", another track appearing on The Thorn, as its B-side. It peaked at number 47 on the UK Singles Chart.

References 

1978 songs
1984 singles
Siouxsie and the Banshees songs
Songs written by Siouxsie Sioux
Songs written by Kenny Morris (musician)
Songs written by Steven Severin
Songs written by John McKay (musician)